In Camera is the debut studio album by Arthur & Yu. It was self-released on June 19, 2007 on Hardly Art Records, which branches off Sub Pop. Stylistically, comparisons to Velvet Underground and early Luna have been drawn, with a hazy atmospheric sound present in the album.

Track listing
"Absurd Heroes Manifestos" – 3:59
"Come to View (Song for Neil Young)" – 3:25
"There Are Too Many Birds" – 2:56
"Afterglow" – 3:47
"Flashing the Lobby Lights" – 2:43
"1000 Words" – 2:40
"Lion's Mouth" – 5:13
"The Ghost of Old Bull Lee" – 2:42
"Half Years" – 3:23
"Black Bear" – 4:11

References

External links
 Official 'Arthur & Yu' Webpage/MySpace

2007 albums